Mohamed Kamanor (born 15 October 1992 in Freetown, Sierra Leone) is a Sierra Leonean footballer who plays for FC Kallon as a defender.

Career

FC Kallon
Mohamaed Kamanor was recruited to top Sierra Leone National Premier League club FC Kallon by popular Sierra Leonean football agent Chernor Musa Jalloh, who is well known for recruiting many talented young Sierra Leonean footballers. While at FC Kallon, Kamanor quickly established himself as one of the most talented players in the Sierra Leone Premier League.

Umeå FC
Kamanor signed for Superettan club Umeå FC in 2012. He was recruited by Umeå FC during the club agent visit to Sierra Leone in early 2012.
Kamanor was again loaned to Umeå FC in the following season 2013

References

  3. ^ http://www.fotbolltransfers.com/news/39593 Officiellt: Umeå FC värvar Lansana Kamara och Mohamed Kamanor

External links

Umeå FC profile

1992 births
Living people
Sierra Leonean footballers
F.C. Kallon players
Umeå FC players
Djurgårdens IF Fotboll players
Superettan players
Sierra Leonean expatriate sportspeople in Sweden
Expatriate footballers in Sweden
Association football defenders
Sportspeople from Freetown